Bogusz Bilewski (25 September 1930 in Starachowice – 14 September 1995 in Wrocław) was a Polish actor. In 1974 he portrayed a secondary role in the Academy Award-nominated film The Deluge under Jerzy Hoffman.

Selected filmography
 Westerplatte (1967)
 The Deluge (1974)

References

External links

1930 births
1995 deaths
People from Starachowice
Polish male film actors
20th-century Polish male actors
Burials at Powązki Cemetery